Star of the Family is an American sitcom that aired on ABC from September 30 to December 9, 1982. The show featured Brian Dennehy as fire chief Leslie "Buddy" Krebs and Katherine Saltzberg, then Maisnik, as his singer daughter, Jennie Lee Krebs. The show was developed by Robin Williams, then an ABC star in Mork & Mindy.

The series debuted on September 30, 1982 on Thursdays after Joanie Loves Chachi, and was canceled after ten episodes.

Synopsis
Fire Captain Buddy Krebs' (Dennehy) 16-year-old daughter Jennie Lee (Saltzberg) begins getting show-business offers because of her singing talents in the country/pop genre. This scares Buddy because he does not want his daughter to grow up too fast. Adding to his troubles, his wife runs off with a bellhop, and  his 17-year-old son (Michael Dudikoff) has more muscles than brains. Additionally, his crew at the firehouse are "strange": Leo Feldman (Todd Susman) tells his mother he is a doctor instead of a fireman; Frank Rosetti (George Deloy) has only sex on the brain; and Max Hernandez (Danny Mora), a Hispanic, speaks fractured English. Finally, his daughter signs with a manager named Judy "Moose" Wells (Judy Pioli): the name fits the description of the woman.  Another character on the series was named Tiffany (played by Amanda Wyss).

Casting

Kathy Maisnik was 19 years old when she was cast as Jennie Lee; Star of the Family was her first professional acting role. Executive producer Larry Brezner said, "The determination to cast her came from Brian Dennehy more than anyone else. We were down to three girls, and each of them had to come in and play the role with 20 network executives looking on. She was the only one who you believed could have stood up to Brian."

Reception
Barbara Holsopple of The Pittsburgh Press said that the show is "great family fun and boasts two gems... Just watching their faces as they react to each other makes your mouth smile as something tugs at your heart."

Bill Hayden of the Gannett News Service panned the show, saying, "Brian Dennehey and Kathy Maisnik deserve medals for valor. These very talented performers are forced to waste their skills as the leads of Star of the Family... The producers have taken what is a bright, engaging concept and encumbered it with so many stock characters and situations that it is a prematurely tired, routine comedy."

Cast
 Brian Dennehy as Leslie "Buddy" Krebs 	
 Kathy Maisnik as Jennie Lee Krebs 	
 Michael Dudikoff as Dougie Krebs 	
 George DelHoyo as Frank Rosetti 	
 Todd Susman as Leo Feldman 	
 Robert Clotworthy as Bigelow

Episodes

US TV Ratings

References

External links
 

1982 American television series debuts
1982 American television series endings
1980s American sitcoms
American Broadcasting Company original programming
English-language television shows
Television series by CBS Studios
Television shows set in Los Angeles